is a passenger railway station located in the city of  Hachiōji, Tokyo, Japan, operated by the private railway operator Keio Corporation.

Lines 
It is located 16.0 kilometers from the terminus of the line at Chōfu Station and 31.5 kilometers from Shinjuku Station. Semi Express, Rapid, and Local services stop at this station.

Station layout 
The station consists of two elevated opposed side platforms serving two tracks. The station building and combined shopping center is located underneath and to the side of the tracks.

Platforms

History
Keio-Horinouchi Station opened on 21 May 1988.

Passenger statistics
In fiscal 2019, the station was used by an average of 32,280 passengers daily. 

The passenger figures (boarding passengers only) for previous years are as shown below.

References

External links

 Keio station information 

Railway stations in Tokyo
Railway stations in Japan opened in 1988
Keio Sagamihara Line
Stations of Keio Corporation
Hachiōji, Tokyo